Marana High School is one of three high schools for the town of Marana, Arizona. It was established in 1975.

Academies

The student body is organized into distinct academies, each with a focus on specific career fields. Freshmen are introduced to the academy system through the Freshman Academy. In the Freshman Academy, students cycle through all four of the school's academies, changing at the beginning of each new quarter, so they can make an informed decision in time for their sophomore year. The Arizona School Boards Association awarded the 2010 Golden Bell Award to the program.

Freshman Academy

Freshmen at Marana High School have the opportunity take the Freshmen Success Academy (FSA) class which combines a nationally-recognized career exploration curriculum with exposure to each of the school's four academies. Each quarter, freshmen rotate to a new FSA teacher with a focus on a different Academy. Freshmen in FSA are mentored by Link Leaders, upperclassmen who aspire to be educators and are enrolled in a career-focused elective to develop teaching skills.  Freshmen are also involved in the school-wide Academy Advisory mentoring program, meeting with upperclassmen for weekly mentoring and career exploration with Academy Advisors.

Business and Human Services Academy 
The Academy of Business and Human Services (BHS) focuses on the foundations of a functioning society impacted by professions like business administration, computer programming, marketing, design and merchandising, culinary arts, early childhood professions, and public service careers. Some courses are eligible for Pima Community College credit.

Marana Arts Academy

Marana Arts Academy focuses on the contributions of the arts to a thriving culture and community, with pathways in photography, fine art, digital media, band, orchestra, theatre, dance, guitar, ceramics, and choir.

MedStart Academy

The MedStart Academy focuses on preparing students for careers in medicine, fitness, and health fields.

Science & Technology

The Marana Academy of Science & Technology focuses on problem solving, innovation, and application of technology through specializations in science, agriculture, and technology courses.

Sports
Marana High is a member of the Arizona Interscholastic Association. It is a 5A Conference school.

Extracurricular activities and clubs
Activities and clubs include Academic Decathlon, Art/Anime Club, Athletic Training, Band, Creative Writing Club, Chess Club, Choir, Cube Club, Culinary Arts, Dance Club, DECA, D&D Club, Drama, E.R.A.S.E., Everyday Christians, FCCLA, Fellowship of Christian Athletes, FFA, Flying Tigers I & II, Interactice Club, International Club, Journalism, Key Club, Library Club, Marine Sciences, Med Start Club, Mu Alpha Theta, National Honor Society, Newspaper, Orchestra, Photography Club, Speech & Debate, Student Council, Students Against Destructive Decisions, S.T.A.N.D., Thespians, VICA-Automotives & Welding, and Yearbook.

Notable alumni 
 Sherry Cervi, professional rodeo barrel racer; four-time World Champion: 1995, 1999, 2010, 2013 
 Rich Hinton, former MLB player (Chicago White Sox, Texas Rangers, New York Yankees, Cincinnati Reds, Seattle Mariners)
 Troy Olsen, country singer
 Ryan Perry, MLB player (Detroit Tigers, Washington Nationals)
 Paul Robinson, former NFL running back with (Cincinnati Bengals, Houston Oilers),  2-time Pro Bowl selection, 1968 NFL Rookie of the Year

References

External links
Marana High School website

Public high schools in Arizona
Schools in Tucson, Arizona
1975 establishments in Arizona
Educational institutions established in 1975